Stables is a surname. Notable people with the surname include:

 Iain Stables (born 1972), New Zealand disc jockey
 Kelly Stables (born 1978), American actress
 Maggie Stables (died 2014), British actress
 William Gordon Stables (1840–1910), Scottish children's writer